The Ol Chiki script, also known as Ol Chemetʼ (Santali: ol 'writing', chemet 'learning'), Ol Ciki, Ol, and sometimes as the Santali alphabet invented by Pandit Raghunath Murmu in the year 1925, is the official writing system for Santali, an Austroasiatic language recognized as an official regional language in India. It is one of the official scripts of the Indian Republic. It has 30 letters, the design of which is intended to evoke natural shapes. The script is written from left to right, and has two styles (the print Chapa style and cursive Usara style). Unicode does not maintain a distinction between these two, as is typical for print and cursive variants of a script. In both styles, the script is unicameral (that is, it does not have separate sets of uppercase and lowercase letters).

History
The Ol Chiki script was created in 1925 by Raghunath Murmu for the Santali language, and publicized first in 1939 at a Mayurbhanj State exhibition. Unlike most Indic scripts, Ol Chiki is not an abugida, but is a true alphabet: giving the vowels equal representation with the consonants.

Before the invention of Ol Chiki script, Santali was written in Bangla, Devanagari, Kalinga and Latin script. However, Santali is not an Indo-Aryan language and Indic scripts did not have letters for all of Santali's phonemes, especially its stop consonants and vowels, which make it difficult to write the language accurately in an unmodified Indic script. 

For example, when missionary and linguist Paul Olaf Bodding, a Norwegian, studied the Santali language and needed to decide how to transcribe it (in producing his widely followed and widely respected reference books such as A Santal Dictionary), he decided to transcribe Santali in the Roman alphabet: despite his observation that Roman script lacks many of the advantages of the Indic scripts, he concluded that the Indic scripts could not adequately serve the Santali language because the Indic scripts lack a way to indicate important features of Santali pronunciation (such as glottalization, combined glottalization and nasalization, and check stops) which can be more easily represented in the Roman alphabet through the use of diacritics. 

The phonology of the Santali language had also been similarly analyzed by various other authors, including Byomkes Chakrabarti in Comparative Study of Santali and Bengali and Baghrai Charan Hembram in A Glimpse of Santali Grammar. However, the Ol Chiki alphabet is considered (by many Santali) to be even more appropriate for the language, because its letter-shapes are derived from the sounds of common Santali words and other frequent Santali morphemes: nouns, demonstratives, adjectives, and verb roots in the Santali language. 
In other words, each Santali letter’s name is, or is derived from, a common word or other element of the Santali language, and each letter’s shape is derive from a simple drawing of the meaning of that word or other element. For example, the Santali letter “ol” (representing the sound /l/) is written with a shape originally derived from a simplified outline drawing of a hand holding a pen, because the name of this letter is also the Santali word for “writing.”

Print and cursive styles 

The existence of these two styles of Ol Chiki was mentioned by the script’s creator: Guru Gomke Pandit Raghunath Murmu (also known as Pandit Murmu) in his book Ol Chemed which explains and teaches the Ol Chiki script. Chapa (Santali for 'print') is used for publication, while usara (Santali for 'quick') is used for handwriting.

Chapa hand 
Ol Chiki chapa, or print style, is the more common style for digital fonts, and is used in the printing of books and newspapers.

Usara hand 
Usara or usara ol is the cursive style, and is largely limited to pen and paper, though there are digital usara typefaces.

Comparison 
These are various differences and similarities between these two styles of Ol Chiki script.

Letters
The values of the Ol Chiki letters are as follows: 

Aspirated consonants are written as digraphs with the letter :  /tʰ/,  /gʱ/,  /kʰ/,  /jʱ/,  /cʰ/,  /dʱ/,  /pʰ/,  /ɖʱ/,  /ɽʱ/,  /ʈʰ/, and  /bʱ/.

Other marks 
Ol Chiki employs several marks which are placed after the letter they modify (there are no combining characters):

Digits 
Ol Chiki has its own set of digits:

Punctuation 
Some Western-style punctuation marks are used with Ol Chiki: the comma, exclamation mark (!), question mark (?), and quotation marks (“ and ”).

The period (.) is not used, because it is visually confusible with the găhlă ṭuḍăg mark (ᱹ).; therefore, instead of periods, the script uses single or two Ol Chiki short dandas:
  (mucăd) marks a minor break
  (double mucăd) marks a major break

Computing

Unicode 

Ol Chiki script was added to the Unicode Standard in April, 2008 with the release of version 5.1.

The Unicode block for Ol Chiki is U+1C50–U+1C7F:

Fonts 

 Google's  Noto  Sans Ol Chiki.

 Microsoft's font family Nirmala UI.

Mixing the two letter styles 
Although Ol Chiki (Chapa) and Ol Chiki (Usara) are normally never mixed, and the original inventor never mentioned mixing these letter styles, there have been some works that mix both forms, using them like English capital and small letters. However, this innovation is yet to be accepted officially.

The invention of a lower case for Ol Chiki  
Since 2017, Santali graphic designer, typographer, and film producer Sudip Iglesias Murmu has been working on design principles to provide a lowercase alphabet form for Ol Chiki, which would permit Ok Chiki writing and keyboarding to use a two-case, or bicameral, format (Using both uppercase and lowercase), as is done in many other written languages, including the Roman-alphabet languages such as English (all of which were once unicameral scripts, but evolved into a bicameral stage over time). As the development of a lowercase form is contributed to developing a standardized cursive form (in those writing systems which use one), the evolution of lowercase is likely to allow standardizing cursive to the point of making it type able alongside more rigid "block" printed letterforms forms  So far, only Ol Chiki (Chapa) letters are used in keyboarding, typesetting, and publishing (in effect, producing capitals-only text for the entirety of all printed or keyboarded documents). In writing quickly by hand, Ol Chiki (Usara) is used: but, despite Ol Usara’s potential for reaching high speed, the circulation of Ol Usara documents is negligible, and Ol Usara is yet to receive Unicode standardization, thus leaving it still neglected.

In hopes to remedy this situation and to harmonize the two scripts, Sudip Iglesias Murmu has innovated by creating a series of lowercase letters, which he has integrated with the already existing font of Ol Chiki. According to him, providing lowercase letters increases the efficiency of keyboarding, both for Ol Chiki (Chapa) and for Ol Chiki (Usara), and allows keyboarding to reach the same speed that can be obtained when typing Santali in Roman-alphabet letters, which are likewise case-sensitive. However, his work is yet to be accepted officially.

See also 
 Byomkes Chakrabarti (a Bengali research worker on ethnic languages)
 Santali Latin alphabet

References 

Alphabets
Santhal
Munda scripts
1925 introductions
Santali language
Constructed scripts
Officially used writing systems of India